Alexander Veljanov (Macedonian: Александар Вељанов) is a Macedonian singer. He became famous through singing in the darkwave band Deine Lakaien which he founded with Ernst Horn in 1985.

Biography 
Veljanov studied theatre and film in Munich and Berlin. He interrupted his studies in 1991 so that he could fully concentrate on music, especially Deine Lakaien. Until 1993 he was a member of the rock band Run Run Vanguard. He is active as a singer and songwriter not only for Deine Lakaien, but also for several side and solo projects. During his career, he has performed as a guest singer with many other artists and bands as well. 

Alexander Veljanov has lived and worked in Berlin, Munich and London. He guards his private life very carefully; in interviews, he rarely speaks about himself and the year of his birth still remains a mystery. And yet in the interview to Swiss on-line magazine Art-Noir on February 23, 2011, he mentioned that "He is now 46".

His latest album Porta Macedonia has covered and sampled songs from the iconic Macedonian group Mizar.

Solo discography

Run Run Vanguard 
 1993: Run Run Vanguard - Suck Success (Album)

Alexander Veljanov 
 1998: Veljanov - Secrets of the Silver Tongue (Album)
 1998: Veljanov - The Man With a Silver Gun (Mini CD)
 1998: Veljanov - Past and Forever (Mini CD)
 2001: Veljanov - The Sweet Life (Album)
 2001: Veljanov - Fly Away (Mini CD)
 2006: Veljanov - Kaleidoscope: A Singles Collection (Compilation)
 2008: Veljanov - Nie mehr/Königin aus Eis (Mini CD)
 2008: Veljanov - Porta Macedonia (Album)

Collaborations 
 1991: The Perc Meets the Hidden Gentleman - Lavender (Album), "The Composition of Incense"
 1993: Das Holz - contribution to "The Lizard King: A Tribute to Jim Morrison Wave & Electro Cover Versionen", "Spanish Caravan"
 1994: Estampie - Ludus Danielis (Album), "Abacuc"
 1995: Sleeping Dogs Wake - Hold me under the Stars (MCD), "Hold me"
 1996: Estampie - Crusaders (Album), "Ahi, amors", "Chaterai por mon corage", "Imperator Rex Greacorum", "Maugréz tous sainz", "Palästinalied", "Quant amors trobet partir"
 1998: Das Holz - Drei (Album), "Alice" + "Jolene"
 2000: Estampie - Ondas (Album), "O Fortuna"
 2002: Stendal Blast - "Nur ein Tag" (MCD)
 2004: Schiller - Leben (Album), with "Desire"
 2006: Edgar Allan Poe Projekt - Visionen (Double Album CD2), with "Lied Für Annabel Lee"

References

External links 
 Official site
 Alexander Veljanov at MySpace

Living people
German male musicians
German people of Macedonian descent
Macedonian emigrants to Germany
1965 births